Royal Naval Air Station Culdrose (RNAS Culdrose, also known as HMS Seahawk; ICAO: EGDR) is a Royal Navy airbase near Helston on the Lizard Peninsula of Cornwall UK, and is one of the largest helicopter bases in Europe. Its main role is serving the Fleet Air Arm's front line AgustaWestland Merlin helicopter squadrons.

History

1940–1999
Admiralty surveyors first started preliminary surveys of land near Helston in 1942. RNAS Culdrose was built by John Laing & Son and commissioned as HMS Seahawk five years after these initial surveys.  The station was originally designed to be a wartime airfield lasting about ten years.

The initial plans were for Culdrose to serve as a Naval Fighting School, it soon developed other roles.  These varied roles included such things as the trials of the Navy's first jets, training of airborne early warning crews and as a home base for carrier-based aircraft.  Over the years the station's emphasis changed from fixed wing aircraft to rotary wing, although its main role remains largely the same.

In 1958, HMS Seahawk was given the Freedom of the Borough of Helston, a parade thanking the town was set up in 1958 and is still happening; on 20 September 2018, the parade celebrated its 60th anniversary.

From 1968 it was one of the designated locations for plan PYTHON, the plan for continuity of government in the event of nuclear war.

2000 onwards

On 18 May 2012, British Airways flight BAW2012 carrying the Olympic Flame, from Athens International Airport, landed at RNAS Culdrose. The aircraft, an Airbus A319 painted yellow and named 'The Firefly', carried dignitaries including Seb Coe, Princess Anne, and David Beckham. The following day the Olympic Flame started its first leg from Land's End, through Cornwall, to Plymouth. Its final destination was the Olympic Stadium in time for the start of the 2012 Summer Olympics.

The air base puts £100 million into the Cornish economy and is one of the largest single-site employers in Cornwall.

Units 
Flying and notable non-flying units based at RNAS Culdrose.

Royal Navy 
Fleet Air Arm
 700X Naval Air Squadron – ScanEagle RM1 and RQ-20 Puma
 750 Naval Air Squadron – Avenger T1
 814 Naval Air Squadron – Merlin HM2
 820 Naval Air Squadron – Merlin HM2
 824 Naval Air Squadron – Merlin HM2
 Merlin Training Facility
 1700 Naval Air Squadron
 Engineering Training Section
 Merlin Depth Maintenance Facility
 Naval Flying Standards Flight (Rotary Wing)
 School of Flight Deck Operations
 HMS Seahawk Volunteer Band

Operations

Helicopter operations

Merlin 
814 Naval Air Squadron and 820 Naval Air Squadron operate the AgustaWestland Merlin HM2 primarily in the carrier based anti-submarine warfare role. The Merlin is fitted with an advanced sensor suite of active/passive sonics, Orange Reaper Electronic Support Measures and Blue Kestrel radar and provides a strong force in under-water warfare and anti-surface unit warfare. The unit's various roles include protecting the Royal Navy against surface and sub-surface threats, command and control, transport, evacuation and Search and Rescue capabilities.

824 Naval Air Squadron is the Merlin Operational Conversion Unit, incorporating the Operational Evaluation Unit flight. The Merlin Training Facility (MTF) is part of 824 NAS, and is a first in that it encompasses pilot, observer, aircrewman and engineering training under one roof. The facility comprises a Cockpit Dynamic Simulator (CDS), 3 Rear Crew Trainers (RCT), 6 Part Task Trainers (PTT), computer-based training (CBT) classrooms, a Mechanical Systems Trainer (MST) and a Weapon Systems Trainer (WST).

Merlin Depth Maintenance Facility

The Merlin Depth Maintenance Facility (MDMF) performs depth maintenance on AW101 Merlin helicopters of the Royal Navy. MDMF is located at RNAS Culdrose, and is a partnership between the UK Ministry of Defence, AgustaWestland, Serco and Lockheed Martin.

For UK Merlin helicopters depth maintenance is centred on a 4-year cycle. MDMF is based upon a pulse line system, similar to a production line; each Merlin "pulses" through 9 phases in turn – removal of major components, inspection, structural repair, fault rectification (3 phases), rebuild, systems test and flight test.

Naval Flying Standards Flight (Rotary Wing) 
All rotary wing (helicopter) pilots, observers and aircrewmen are assessed annually by NFSF(RW) examiners. This covers all helicopter squadrons at RNAS Yeovilton as well as Culdrose. The assessment consists of a ground exam and a check flight, and may also occur if a squadron has referred them to NFSF(RW).

Engineering Training Section 
The Engineering Training Section (ETS) at RNAS Culdrose is a unit of the Air Engineering Department that is dedicated to the instruction of Merlin Mk2, Mk3 and generic air engineering training. The primary task of the ETS is to train sufficient air engineering personnel to enable the front line to achieve operational capability.  It comprises approximately 20 personnel including both service and civilian instructors and is headed by a lieutenant who is responsible to Commander of Air Engineering.

Observer training 
750 Naval Air Squadron provides grading and Basic Observer Training for the Fleet Air Arm's observers and operates the Beechcraft Avenger T1.

Unmanned aerial vehicle operations 
700X Naval Air Squadron is the Royal Navy's first squadron of unmanned aerial vehicles (UAV) using ScanEagle aircraft. In 2014, 700X Naval Air Squadron was one of the smallest naval units with twelve personnel but numbers could double the following year.

Other units

1700 Naval Air Squadron 
1700 Naval Air Squadron provides qualified specialist personnel to man, operate and maintain all Royal Naval controlled systems in all aviation capable platforms in both the Royal Navy and the Royal Fleet Auxiliary. The unit provides tailored teams, ranging in size and specialisms and can comprise aircraft handlers, aircraft controllers, fire-fighters, military police officers, logistical personnel, engineers, medics and other specialists to allow the continued operation and protection of naval aircraft worldwide. Established in December 2007, the unit was previously known as the Maritime Aviation Support Force (MASF). It was renamed 1700 Naval Air Squadron on 31 October 2017.

Motto: Auxilio Ad Alta (Reaching The Heights With Help)

School of Flight Deck Operations 

The Royal Naval School of Flight Deck Operations provides professional training for all naval aircraft handlers. The school also trains other Navy personnel and personnel from the RAF and Army who will be involved in operating aircraft at sea.

Trainees are trained in activities they will be required to carry out during their career, such as tackling aircraft fires and aircraft deck handling. Equipment used includes; mock-up can be produced and adjusted at the instructors control and the "Dummy Deck", a full-sized replica of an Invincible class aircraft carrier's deck allowing trainees to practice their roles in realistic environments, experiencing training with live aircraft with reduced risk and danger compared to operating on a real aircraft carrier.

Motto: Nostris in Manibus Tuti (Safe in our Hands)

Predannack Airfield 
RNAS Culdrose has a satellite airfield at Predannack which it uses primarily as a relief landing ground and night flying for helicopter pilot training; it also houses a small arms range and aircraft fire fighting facilities.

HMS Seahawk Volunteer Band 

The HMS Seahawk Volunteer Band is one of the nine volunteer bands under the Royal Marines Band Service. It performs regularly around Culdrose and Helston, performing a mainly Ceremonial role on events such as the Freedom of Helston Parade. Although mainly a wind band as well as a marching band, it also includes jazz ensembles and a corps of drums.

In July 2003, the band was awarded the Bambara Trophy, the recipient of which is considered to be the best band in the Fleet Air Arm. On 7 June 2016 the band performed a dawn fanfare on the King Harry Ferry to honour the official birthday of HM Queen Elizabeth II.

The list of bandmasters are as follows:

Colour Sergeant Rich Fenwick (?–2004)
Colour Sergeant Paul Nolan (May 2004–2014)
Colour Sergeant Dom O’Connor (2014–Present)

Former Squadrons based at RNAS Culdrose

700 Naval Air SquadronThe squadron was disbanded on 31 March 2008. With two Merlin helicopters, Squadron 700M carried out trial modifications and developed tactics and operational procedure. The Motto was : "Experienta Docet" – "Experience Teaches"

Fleet Requirements Air Direction Unit (FRADU)

FRADU was operated by the contractor Serco Defence and Aerospace as part of the RN MAC 2004, using 13 BAE Hawk T1 advanced jet trainer aircraft on lease to the Royal Navy from the RAF and based at RNAS Culdrose. Two of these aircraft were permanently detached to Naval Flying Standards Flight (Fixed Wing) at RNAS Yeovilton where they were flown by RN pilots, but maintained by Serco engineers.

With the draw-down of the Sea King force and the return of British forces from Afghanistan, 854 NAS & 857 NAS were merged back into 849 NAS in 2014.

It also administered the Sea Kings on detachment at HMS Gannet. The squadron was stood down on 1 January 2016, decommissioned on 22 March 2016 and was responsible for saving over 15,000 lives on more than 9,000 missions.

Between October 2004 and March 2018, 829 Naval Air Squadron provided up to three ship's flights capable of deploying with Type 23 frigates. The squadron decommissioned on 28 March 2018, with the unit's aircraft and personnel becoming part of 814 Naval Air Squadron, creating the largest ever Merlin squadron.

849 Naval Air Squadron disbanded in April 2020. This previously provided the Royal Navy's airborne surveillance and control.

Airborne threat simulation 
Hawk T1's of 736 Naval Air Squadron provided a maritime aggressor squadron for Royal Navy ships and vessels of other foreign navies, simulating missile attacks and fast jet attacks on warships in the naval exercise areas south and west of Plymouth. The unit was an evolution of the previous Fleet Requirements Aircraft Direction Unit (FRADU) and was supported by the defence contractor SERCO. The Unit was decommissioned in Spring 2022, with the Hawk jets leaving Cornwall on Thursday 24th March 2022. 

The squadron was decommissioned on 31 March 2022.

See also

 List of air stations of the Royal Navy
 Torrey Canyon oil spill#Oil spill

References

Citations

Sources 
 London, Peter, (1999), RNAS Culdrose, Sutton's photographic history of aviation series, Sutton Publishing Ltd, 128pp, Gloucester UK, .
 
 Wakeham, Geoff, (1997), Royal Naval Air Station Culdrose 1947–1997, publ. Royal Naval Air Station Culdrose, 103pp,

External links 

 
 RNAS Culdrose section of helis.com Helicopter History site

Military units and formations established in 1947
Culdrose
Military history of Cornwall
Organisations based in Cornwall
Airports in Cornwall